Interiors is a 1978 dramatic film by Woody Allen.

Interiors may also refer to:

 Interiors (Ativin album), a 2002 album by Ativin
 Interiors (Brad album), a 1997 album by the band Brad
 Interiors (Glasser album), a 2013 album by Glasser
 Interiors (Quicksand album), a 2017 album by Quicksand
 Interiors (Rosanne Cash album), a 1990 album by Rosanne Cash

See also 
 Interior (disambiguation)